Bécancour may refer to a location in Canada:

Bécancour, Quebec, the amalgamated city
Bécancour, Quebec (community), a sector of the same city
Bécancour Regional County Municipality, Quebec
Bécancour River, a river within the Saint Lawrence River watershed

See also
Bas-Richelieu—Nicolet—Bécancour, a Canadian electoral district